Kyzyl-Syr Airport  is an airport in Russia located 1 km southeast of Kyzyl-Syr.

Airports built in the Soviet Union
Airports in the Sakha Republic